The UAZ-452 "Bukhanka" ('Буханка' or 'bread loaf') are a family of compact Russian cab over engine vans and light trucks with standard four-wheel drive, off-road capability, built by the Ulyanovsk Automobile Plant (UAZ) since 1965. The vans got their nickname due to their outer resemblance to a loaf of bread – except the ambulance version, which gets called a "Tabletka" ('Таблетка'), or 'pill' in Russian.

Since 1985, the vans received updates: more modern engines and internationally compliant lighting, as well as new model numbers, 3741 for the standard van, while (crew-cab) trucks mostly starting with 3303, often with one or two extra digits specifying the version. From 1997, bigger 33036 truck variants with a 25 cm (10 in) longer wheelbase, and taller soft-top roof bows and drop-sides were added.

Overview

The model's predecessor, the UAZ-450 (produced between 1958 and 1966), was based on the chassis and engine of the four-wheel drive light truck GAZ-69, and was the first "forward control" vehicle of this type to be built in Russia or anywhere else in the Soviet Union. The -450 was lightly revised and simplified, resulting in the -452. Because of the external similarities to a loaf of bread, the van became known as Буханка (bukhanka, or 'loaf' in Russian). The ambulance version was nicknamed Таблетка (tabletka, a pill). The van is produced in several modifications, with the main difference being the body type (e.g. UAZ-3741 van (known as bukhanka), or the UAZ-3303 pickup truck, which is known as golovastik, tadpole).

The body of the van is normally equipped with two front doors, a single-wing door on the right side and a double-wing door at the rear, although the exact configuration can vary depending on the specific modification. Notable in the van are the fuel ports on the left and the right side of the van, leading to two separate fuel tanks.
  
The engine, placed between  the driver and the passenger seats, was the same   UMZ 452MI inline-four as the UAZ-469, and was able to run on gasoline of as low as 72 octane (76 was preferred).

History
Vehicles produced between 1965–1979 were equipped with old-style lights: turn signal lights were colorless (white), rear lights were round, and the back of the body was rounder. Subsequent post-1979 models got amber (yellow) signal lights, and rear lights were slightly bigger and rectangular.

In 1985 the van was upgraded and spun off into separate submodels: 39625, 3962, 3303, 3909 and 2206. The upgrade consisted of lighting fixtures that met modern international requirements, alarms, a new instrument panel, and a new speedometer. The brakes were redesigned. The engine was also upgraded, and its power output increased to 99 hp against the previous 78 hp.

In the early 2000s, the model was given new plastic side mirrors taken from the GAZ GAZelle van, headrests on front seats; and new passenger seats for a minibus version (2206) were also given headrests. The pickup truck (version 3303) was fitted with a metal body instead of a wooden one.

In subsequent years, the engine was upgraded to meet modern emissions requirements, and the van was also fitted with an injury-reducing plastic steering wheel.

In March 2011, models 39625, 3962, and 2206 received upgrades, consisting of ABS brakes, power steering, seat belts and the Euro-4 engine as standard equipment.

Models

Former
UAZ-452 variants:
 UAZ-452 – van, the main version
 UAZ-452A – ambulance, aka "санитарка" (Sanitarka - the medic lady), popularly nicknamed the "таблетка" (tabletka - "tablet" or "pill"). The van could seat up to 4 stretchers or 6 on the benches and one accompanying both. The vehicle was not comfortable for people on the move, as suspension in the submodel remained that of the standard model, but this van was, and in many places is still the only ambulance vehicle that can reach some of the most remote places.
 UAZ-452AS – ambulance for Arctic areas
 UAZ-452AE – chassis cab for installation of various equipment
 UAZ-452V – convertible van wagon
 UAZ-452D – a truck with double cab and wooden body (cutaway-van chassis)
 UAZ-452DG – experimental 6x6 version
 UAZ-452G – ambulance with different capacity from the UAZ-452A 
 UAZ-452K – experimental 16-seater three-axle bus (6×4) (1973).
 UAZ-452P – tractor

Current
List of current UAZ-452 models:
 UAZ-2206 – 6 to 11 seat Minibus
 UAZ–22069 – a modification of the UAZ-2206 with a 98-horsepower engine UMZ-4218.10, increasing to 2.9 liters volume. Rough terrain buses provide permanent all-wheel drive and increased ground clearance. The maximum speed of 110–115 km/h.
 UAZ-3303 (UAZ-452D) Golovastik (En:Tadpole) – pickup truck with a 2-person all-metal cab
 UAZ-3741 – all-metal cargo van capable of carrying loads up to 850 kg 
 UAZ-3909 – "фермер" (farmer), Combi which carries 6 passengers and 450 kg of cargo; the rear compartment is separated from the front (driver's) row with a window.
 UAZ-3909i – military ambulance with a red cross on the roof and bonnet
 UAZ-3962 – "Tabletka" (Tablet) ambulance, can accommodate up to 9 people or equivalent load. 
 UAZ-39625 – strict passenger and cargo version of the UAZ-3962. Differs from the 3909 version in the fact that the 3909 version has real and stationary passenger seats, and a separate not glassed-in cargo compartment behind the passenger compartment; and a fully glazed version 39625 has seats installed in the cargo hold, and the sides have a hinged bench.
 UAZ-39094 – crewcab pickup truck with a 10 cm metal platform with a wooden floor equipped with a removable frame tent and awning, 3 dropsides. Cargo bed replaceable by utility and special service bodies.

Users

Specifications

Gallery

See also

 Barkas B 1000
 Jeep Forward Control
 Land Rover 101 Forward Control
 Volvo C303, 4x4 cab-over vans
 Volkswagen Type 2 ("Microbus")

References 
This article has been brought over from the Russian Wikipedia article.

External links 
 UAZ official site
 UAZ-452 official site

Military vehicles of the Soviet Union
Soviet automobiles
Military light utility vehicles
UAZ
Military vehicles of Russia
Cars of Russia
1960s cars
1970s cars
1980s cars
1990s cars
2000s cars
2010s cars
Cab over off-road vehicles
Cab over vehicles
Military vehicles introduced in the 1960s